Kaiparathina vaubani is a species of sea snail, a marine gastropod mollusk in the family Trochidae.

Description
The length of the shell attains 3.7 mm.

Distribution
This marine species occurs off New Caledonia.

References

 Marshall B.A. (1993) A review of the genus Kaiparathina Laws, 1941 (Mollusca: Gastropoda: Trochoidea). The Veliger 36: 185-198

External links
 To World Register of Marine Species

vaubani
Gastropods described in 1993